Sir George Carew (died 13 November 1612) was an English diplomat, historian and Member of Parliament.

Life
He was the second son of Thomas Carew of Antony and brother of Richard Carew. He was educated at Oxford and entered the Middle Temple before travelling abroad. At the recommendation of Queen Elizabeth I, who conferred on him the honour of a knighthood, he was appointed secretary to Sir Christopher Hatton. Later, having been promoted to a Mastership in Chancery, he was sent as ambassador to the King of Poland.

He sat in Parliament for St. Germans in 1584, for Saltash in 1586, 1588, 1593, and for St. Germans in 1597 and 1601.

The honour of knighthood was conferred upon him at the Palace of Whitehall on 23 July 1603. According to Dudley Carleton, Carew rode north to meet Anne of Denmark in June 1603, in an unsuccessful attempt to gain an office in her household.

Family
He married Thomazine Carew, the daughter of Sir Francis Godolphin and his first wife Margaret Killigrew. They had two sons and three daughters, including:

 Francis Carew, son and heir.
 Louisa Carew, who married John Houston.
 Sophia Carew, mother of La Belle Stuart.

Thomazine, or Thomasine, Lady Carew, was a lady-in-waiting to Anne of Denmark. The queen gave her gifts of clothes she had worn, including in February 1610 at Whitehall Palace, a black satin gown in a plain bias cut, and another black gown with blue "galloons" or lace strips. Lady Carew walked in the procession at Anne of Denmark's funeral in 1619 as a lady of the Privy Chamber.

Writings
During the reign of James I he was employed in negotiations with Scotland and for several years was ambassador to the court of France. On his return, he wrote a Relation of the State of France, written in the classical style of the Elizabethan age and featuring sketches of the leading persons at the court of Henry IV. It appears as an appendix to Thomas Birch's Historical View of the Negotiations between the Courts of England, France and Brussels, from 1592 to 1617, 1749. The work A Relation of the State of Polonia, produced between 1598 and 1603, used to be attributed to Carew, but in 2014 Sobecki definitively identified John Peyton as the author and the coronation of James VI and I in 1603 as the date of completion. Sobecki's identification is based on Peyton's letters about this work and the finding of a second copy of A Relation of the State of Polonia written in Peyton's hand and dated and signed by Peyton himself.

See also

Explanatory footnotes

References

 Attribution
 
 

1612 deaths
16th-century births
16th-century English writers
16th-century English historians
16th-century male writers
17th-century English diplomats
17th-century English historians
17th-century English male writers
17th-century English writers
Alumni of the University of Oxford
Ambassadors of England to France
Ambassadors of England to Poland
George
English diplomats
English knights
English MPs 1584–1585
English MPs 1586–1587
English MPs 1589
English MPs 1593
English MPs 1597–1598
English MPs 1601
English MPs 1604–1611
Members of the Middle Temple
Members of the pre-1707 English Parliament for constituencies in Cornwall
People from Antony, Cornwall
Year of birth missing
Knights Bachelor